Charles Kaiser Sumner (1874–1948) was an American architect, practicing primarily in California. He was born Charles Sumner Kaiser in Wilkes-Barre, Pennsylvania in 1874, and studied at the Columbia University School of Architecture. He received a traveling scholarship to Europe and the Middle East and was hired by McKim, Mead and White in New York, working for Charles Follen McKim. Kaiser, as he was still known, moved to Berkeley, California in 1906 and opened a practice there, designing houses and the Claremont Club, as well as houses and the Farmers and Merchants Bank in Sacramento.  In 1916 he moved to Palo Alto and established his practice in San Francisco. Responding to anti-German sentiment during World War I, he reversed his middle and last names in 1917, calling himself "Charles Kaiser Sumner."

Sumner designed as many as fifty houses in Palo Alto, with twenty houses on the Stanford University campus. His work was primarily residential, with occasional commercial or institutional clients.  At the request  and personal expense of National Park Service director Stephen T. Mather, Sumner designed the Rangers' Club in Yosemite National Park in 1928, now a National Historic Landmark. Sumner practiced until 1941. He died in Palo Alto on May 25, 1948.

References

External links
 Charles K. Sumner at Palo Alto Stanford Heritage

Architects from California
Architects from Pennsylvania
1874 births
1948 deaths
People from Wilkes-Barre, Pennsylvania
Columbia Graduate School of Architecture, Planning and Preservation alumni
Artists from Berkeley, California